Rock Hill High School is a public high school in Frisco, Texas in the United States. Although the school is located in Frisco, it mostly serves students from Prosper and McKinney. Rock Hill is currently one of two high schools in Prosper ISD, the other being Prosper High School. A third high school in the district, Walnut Grove High School, is set to open in the 2023-2024 school year.

History 
Before the opening of Rock Hill High School, there was only one high school in Prosper ISD: Prosper High School. Due to the rapidly increasing number of students in Prosper ISD, the district began construction of a second high school in the summer of 2018. The district spent over $200 million dollars on the construction of the school, the most ever spent on a high school in Texas at the time. This school became Rock Hill, and the school opened in the 2020-2021 school year.

The bottom half of Prosper High School's zone was designated to Rock Hill's new attendance zone. Students already attending Prosper High School who lived in the Rock Hill school zone had the choice of staying at Prosper High School or transferring to the new Rock Hill High School. Because the school opened during the coronavirus pandemic, students also had the option of attending school in person or taking lessons virtually. This was exclusive to the 2020-2021 school year.

Rock Hill opened as a UIL Class 5A school but was reclassified as a 6A school starting from the 2022-2023 school year. It is one of the smallest 6A schools in the state in terms of enrollment.

Athletics 
As of 2022, Rock Hill High School is a part of 6A Region 1 District 5. Other schools in this conference are Allen High School, Braswell High School, Guyer High School, Little Elm High School, McKinney High School, McKinney Boyd High School and Prosper High School.

Rock Hill has official teams in these sports:

 Archery
 Baseball
 Basketball
 Cross Country
 Football

Golf
 Powerlifting
 Soccer
 Softball
 2021 5A State Semifinalists
 Swimming and Diving
 Water Polo
 Tennis
 Track & Field
 Volleyball
 Wrestling

Other Organizations 

 Band 
 Marching Band

 Guard
 Jazz Band
Theatre
 Choir
 Debate Team
 Drill Team (Rockettes)
 Orchestra
 eSports
 Rocket League Team
 Bollywood Dance Team
 Step Team (Elite Hawks)
 HOSA-Future Health Professionals

References

Public high schools in Texas
Schools in Collin County, Texas
Frisco, Texas